Ramón Barnils Folguera (Sabadell, Barcelona, Spain, October 13, 1940 – Reus, Barcelona, Spain, March 14, 2001) was a Spaniard journalist and translator. He worked for several media such as Tele/eXpres, El Noticiero Universal, Agència EFE, El Temps, and La Vanguardia. He helped publish the satirical magazine El be negre amb potes rosses. He also helped publish Ajoblanco, Solidaridad Obrera and participated in Catalunya Ràdio from the day of its foundation.

He worked as a teacher of future journalists at university from 1976 to 1985, where he focused on the importance of previous research in order to write good articles. From that position, he was able to write the history of the Iberian Liberation Movement.

Notes

Bibliography 
 
 

Journalists from Catalonia
People from Sabadell
1940 births
2001 deaths